Anthoboscus oculatus is a species of beetle in the family Cerambycidae. It was described by Giesbert in 1992.

References

Clytini
Beetles described in 1992
Taxa named by Edmund Francis Giesbert